The Sky Paragliders Lift is a Czech single-place paraglider, designed and produced by Sky Paragliders of Frýdlant nad Ostravicí. Available in the mid-2000s, it is now out of production.

Design and development
The Lift was designed as an intermediate glider. The models are each named for their approximate wing area in square metres.

Variants
Lift 24
Small-sized model for lighter pilots. The glider model is AFNOR Standard certified.
Lift 26
Mid-sized model for medium-weight pilots. The glider model is AFNOR Standard certified.
Lift 28
Large-sized model for heavier pilots. The glider model is AFNOR Standard certified.
Lift 30
Extra large-sized model for heavier pilots. The glider model is AFNOR Standard certified.

Specifications (Lift 26)

References

Lift
Paragliders